Ève Josette Noelle Périsset (born 24 December 1994) is a French professional footballer who plays as a right-back for Women's Super League club Chelsea and the France national team.

Club career
Périsset started her professional career at Lyon in 2012. In 2016, she moved to Paris Saint-Germain.

On 19 June 2020, Bordeaux announced the signing of Périsset on a two-year deal.

On 8 June 2022, Périsset joined FA WSL club Chelsea on a three-year deal.

International career
Périsset participated in several French youth teams. In 2014, she was part of the squad that finished third at the 2014 FIFA U-20 Women's World Cup in Canada.

Périsset made her senior team debut on 16 September 2016 in a 1–1 draw against Brazil. In 2017, she was among the 23 women who represented France at the UEFA Women's Euro 2017.

Career statistics

Club

International

Scores and results list France's goal tally first, score column indicates score after each Périsset goal.

References

External links
 
 
 
 
 
 Player's Profile at Foot o Feminin
 Player's Profile at PSG

1994 births
Living people
France women's youth international footballers
France women's international footballers
French women's footballers
Women's association football defenders
Paris Saint-Germain Féminine players
Division 1 Féminine players
2019 FIFA Women's World Cup players
UEFA Women's Euro 2022 players
UEFA Women's Euro 2017 players
French expatriate women's footballers
French expatriate sportspeople in England
Expatriate women's footballers in England
Chelsea F.C. Women players
Women's Super League players
Olympique Lyonnais Féminin players
FC Girondins de Bordeaux (women) players
Sportspeople from Lyon Metropolis
Footballers from Auvergne-Rhône-Alpes